The Southeast Missouri State Redhawks football program is the intercollegiate American football team for the Southeast Missouri State University located in the U.S. state of Missouri. The team competes in the NCAA Division I Football Championship Subdivision (FCS) and are members of the Ohio Valley Conference. The school's first football team was fielded in 1902. The team plays its home games at the 11,015-seat Houck Stadium. They are coached by Tom Matukewicz.

History
Southeast Missouri State first competed in football in 1904. In 1912, the school joined the Missouri Intercollegiate Athletics Association (MIAA), which later joined the NCAA as a Division II conference. The football team had its first known head coach, J.F. Corleux, in 1915. Corleux remained head coach until 1929.

In 1991, Southeast Missouri State joined the Ohio Valley Conference and moved up to the Division I-AA level.

Classifications
1952–1957: NAIA
1958–1972: NCAA College Division
1973–1990: NCAA Division II
1991–present: NCAA Division I–AA/FCS

Conference memberships
1902–1923: Independent
1924–1990: Mid-America Intercollegiate Athletics Association
1991–present: Ohio Valley Conference

Conference championships 
Southeast Missouri State has won 19 conference championships, 12 outright and seven shared.

† Co-champions

FCS Playoffs results
The Redhawks have appeared in the FCS playoffs four times with an overall record of 1–4.

Rivalries
Southeast Missouri State has an in-state rivalry with Missouri State. The two schools last played in 2008, and Missouri State leads the series 46–28.

Another rivalry is with Southern Illinois. The annual series between the schools went on hiatus after 2005 and resumed in 2010. In 2013, the two schools played in a game called the College Classic, at Busch Stadium in St. Louis. In the first-ever football game held at Busch, Southern Illinois won 36-19. In 2014, the rivalry game was played at SIU's stadium in Carbondale, Illinois, and Southern Illinois won 50-23. Southeast Missouri State leads the series 39–35–8 as of 2014.

Within the Ohio Valley Conference, Southeast Missouri State's rival is Murray State. Murray State leads the series 38–10–1 as of 2014.

Notable former players

Current coaching staff

Future non-conference opponents 
Announced schedules as of December 9, 2022.

References

External links
 

 
American football teams established in 1902
1902 establishments in Missouri